Paul David Stinchcombe KC (born 25 April 1962) is an English barrister and Labour Party politician in the United Kingdom.

Early life
Stinchcombe went to the Royal Grammar School, High Wycombe. At Trinity College, Cambridge, he studied law, gaining a double first MA. Stinchcombe went to Harvard Law School in Cambridge, Massachusetts, gaining a LLM. He became a barrister, working alongside Cherie Blair, specialising in environmental law. Stinchcombe was a councillor for the Brunswick ward in the London Borough of Camden from 1990 to 1994. He is a Christian Socialist who used Biblical imagery in his speeches, being also a speechwriter for Tony Blair as Prime Minister.

Parliamentary career
Stinchcombe was the Member of Parliament (MP) for Wellingborough from 1997 until the 2005 general election when he lost his seat to Peter Bone of the Conservative Party. He had gained the seat from Peter Fry. His election was one of Labour's most surprise victories, with Stinchcombe only winning the seat by a small majority of 187 votes. In 2001 he joined the Commons environment, food and rural affairs select committee.

Career at the bar
Immediately after the election Stinchcombe returned to his profession as a barrister. He was appointed, following the Bar Council's assessment, a QC in 2011. Stinchcombe moved chambers to 39 Essex Street in 2013.

References

External links
 They Work For You
 Ask Aristotle
 4-5 Grays Inn Square barristers

External links 
 

1962 births
Living people
British barristers
Labour Party (UK) MPs for English constituencies
Councillors in the London Borough of Camden
UK MPs 1997–2001
UK MPs 2001–2005
People educated at the Royal Grammar School, High Wycombe
Alumni of Trinity College, Cambridge
Harvard Law School alumni
People from High Wycombe
Labour Party (UK) councillors